Parliamentary elections in Iran began in September 1941, when Reza Shah was still in power, and were continued during the Anglo-Soviet invasion of Iran and succession of his son Mohammad Reza Shah.

Prime Minister Mohammad Ali Foroughi came under great pressures to nullify the election results which were considered devoid of legitimacy.

Immediately after the elections and departure of the Reza Shah, members of the parliament who were individually handpicked by him before his abdication, turned around and asked for investigations on his "misdeeds".

References

Iran
1941 in Iran
National Consultative Assembly elections
Electoral fraud in Iran